Bukui Mosque is a mosque in Qiqihar, Heilongjiang, China. It is located in Mosque Road off Bukui Street. It was built during the Qing dynasty, and listed in 2006 as a Major Site to Be Protected for Its Historical and Cultural Value at the National Level. It is the largest and oldest mosque in the province.

History and structure
The name "Bukui" is the Chinese transcription of a Daur word meaning "auspicious". Bukui Mosque originally consisted of two separate mosques:
The East Mosque, a three-storey, 374 square metre building constructed in Kangxi 23 (1684), predating the city of Qiqihar by seven years
The West Mosque, a two-storey, 173 square metre building constructed in Xianfeng 3 (1852) by followers of the Jahriyya menhuan who immigrated from Gansu
The mosque contains roughly 2,000 square metres of constructed space; the whole compound covers an area of roughly 6,400 square metres. The two prayer spaces together can hold a total of roughly 450 people.

The mosque's long history has led to a saying in Qiqihar: "the mosque existed long before the town Bukui". In 1958, the two mosques were reorganised as a single mosque, with the name "Qiqihar Mosque". The mosque was listed as a city-level protected cultural relic in 1980, and as a provincial-level protected cultural relic in 1981; its name was then also changed to the present "Bukui Mosque". An assessment done that year found that while the East Mosque was in relatively good condition, there was serious structural damage to the West Mosque. Reconstruction efforts were undertaken in 1989–1990. On 25 June 2006, the State Council of the People's Republic of China entered Bukui Mosque onto the sixth batch list of Major Sites Protected at the National Level.

See also
Islam in China
List of mosques in China
List of famous mosques 
Timeline of Islamic history 
Islamic architecture 
Islamic art 
List of mosques

Footnotes

References

External links

 Photos of the Bukui mosque 

1684 establishments in China
17th-century mosques
Major National Historical and Cultural Sites in Heilongjiang
Mosques in China
Qiqihar
Mosques completed in 1684